The 1987–88 St. Francis Terriers men's basketball team represented St. Francis College during the 1987–88 NCAA Division I men's basketball season. The team was coached by Bob Valvano, who was in his fourth year at the helm of the St. Francis Terriers. The Terrier's home games were played at the Generoso Pope Athletic Complex. The team has been a member of the Northeast Conference since 1981, although at this time the conference was known as the ECAC Metro Conference.

The Terriers finished their season at 11–18 overall and 5–11 in conference play. They qualified for the NEC Tournament with the 6th seed and beat Robert Morris in the opening round before losing to Monmouth in the semifinals.

Roster

Schedule and results

|- 
!colspan=9 style=| Regular season

      
   
 

     

 

  

    
|- 
!colspan=9 style=| ECAC Metro tournament

NEC awards

Andre Kibbler, Rookie of the Year

References

St. Francis Brooklyn Terriers men's basketball seasons
St. Francis
St. Francis Brooklyn Terriers men's basketball
St. Francis Brooklyn Terriers men's basketball